Thangalur  is a village in Thrissur district in the state of Kerala, India.

Demographics
 India census, Thangalur had a population of 5702 with 2755 males and 2947 females.

References

Villages in Thrissur district